Brochantite is a sulfate mineral, one of a number of cupric sulfates. Its chemical formula is Cu4SO4(OH)6. Formed in arid climates or in rapidly oxidizing copper sulfide deposits, it was named by Armand Lévy for his fellow Frenchman, geologist and mineralogist A. J. M. Brochant de Villiers.

Crystals of brochantite can range from emerald green to black-green to blue-green, and can be acicular or prismatic. Brochantite is often associated with minerals such as malachite, azurite, and chrysocolla, and may form pseudomorphs with these minerals.

The mineral is found in a number of locations around the world, notably the southwestern United States (especially Arizona), Serifos in Greece and Chile.

Brochantite is a common corrosion product on bronze sculptures located in urban areas, where atmospheric sulfur dioxide (a common pollutant) is present. Brochantitie forms mainly in exposed areas where weathering prevents accumulation copper ions and enhancement in the acidity of water films. In sheltered areas, the main corrosion product is antlerite.

Gallery

References

External links

Copper(II) minerals
Sulfate minerals
Monoclinic minerals
Minerals in space group 14